Artur Victor Guimarães (born 15 February 1998), simply known as Artur, is a Brazilian professional footballer who plays as forward for Red Bull Bragantino.

Club career

Palmeiras
Born in Fortaleza, Ceará, Artur moved to Campo Maior, Piauí at the age of three, but returned to his hometown ten years later. He immediately joined Ceará's youth setup, and moved to Palmeiras in 2015. On 21 October 2016, he signed a new five-year contract with the latter club.

Artur made his first team – and Série A – debut on 11 December 2016, coming on as a late substitute for goalscorer Alecsandro in a 2–1 away win over Vitória, as his side was already champions. For the 2017 campaign, he was loaned to Novorizontino in the Campeonato Paulista and Londrina in the Série B.

Back to Palmeiras for the 2018 campaign, Artur renewed his contract until 2021 on 8 January 2018, and was assigned to the main squad. However, he featured rarely during the season, and moved on loan to Bahia on 4 January 2019.

Red Bull Bragantino

On 8 January 2020, Artur was announced at Red Bull Bragantino on a five-year deal, for a club record R$ 25 million fee. On 22 September 2021, he scored from the penalty spot in Red Bull Bragantino's 2–0 win over Club Libertad in the first leg of their Copa Sudamericana semi-final tie. He repeated the feat in the second leg a week later, securing a 5–1 aggregate win, and a spot in the final of a major international competition for the first time in Bragantino history.

International career
After representing Brazil at under-20 and under-23 levels, Artur was called up to the full side in September 2021, for two FIFA World Cup qualifying matches against Argentina and Peru.

Career statistics

Honours
Palmeiras
Campeonato Brasileiro Série A: 2016, 2018

Londrina
Primeira Liga: 2017

Bahia
Campeonato Baiano: 2019

References

External links

1998 births
Living people
Sportspeople from Fortaleza
Brazilian footballers
Association football forwards
Campeonato Brasileiro Série A players
Campeonato Brasileiro Série B players
Sociedade Esportiva Palmeiras players
Grêmio Novorizontino players
Londrina Esporte Clube players
Esporte Clube Bahia players
Red Bull Bragantino players
Brazil youth international footballers